Ahcène Lahmar (3 August 1980 in Taher, Jijel Province – 8 October 2009 in Béjaïa) was an Algerian footballer. He played as a midfielder for JSM Béjaïa and MSP Batna.

Death
On 8 October 2009, Lahmar died from a heart attack in a hospital room in the Frantz Fanon Hospital in Béjaïa, Algeria, after suffering from pneumonia.

He was honored by his club JSM Béjaïa in its next game following his death, a league match against CA Bordj Bou Arreridj. Players from both teams entered the pitch with black t-shirts with his face on them. Club officials then held an official ceremony presenting his father and two brothers an official framed jersey before holding a minute of silence in his honor prior to kick off. The fans in the stadium also prepared a giant two-piece black tifo with the messages "Lahmar 24" and "Repose en paix" (Rest in Peace).

References

1980 births
2009 deaths
People from Taher
Algerian footballers
JSM Béjaïa players
MSP Batna players
Association football midfielders
21st-century Algerian people
Deaths from pneumonia in Algeria